The Åstrand test is a way of measuring VO2 max (maximum rate of oxygen consumption as measured during incremental exercise).

References

Exercise physiology